Stanislav Drastich (born 14 July 1954) is a former ice dancer who competed for Czechoslovakia. With Liliana Řeháková, he placed fourth at the 1979 European Championships, the 1979 World Championships, and the 1980 Winter Olympics.

Competitive highlights 
(with Řeháková)

References 

1954 births
Czechoslovak male ice dancers
Living people
Sportspeople from Opava
Olympic figure skaters of Czechoslovakia
Figure skaters at the 1980 Winter Olympics